Ken Higgs (born January 12, 1931) is a former Canadian football player who played for the BC Lions.

References

1931 births
Living people
Players of Canadian football from British Columbia
Canadian football running backs
BC Lions players
Canadian football people from Vancouver